Nathan Hale High School is a high school in Tulsa, Oklahoma.  Opened in 1959, it is  part of the Tulsa Public Schools, and is a public school for students from grades 9 through 12.  In 2009, the school established a restaurant, lodging, and health management magnet school program, which in 2010 began operating a restaurant open to the public once a week for lunch.

Notable graduates
Erika Anderson - actress, model
Mikey Burnett - professional mixed martial arts fighter
Gary Busey - actor
Gary Condit - former United States Representative (Democrat-California)
Ray Murphy, Jr. - college wrestler for Oklahoma State and 1989 Handicapped Person of the Year
Gerry Pirtle - former major league baseball pitcher
Mary Kay Place - actress, singer, director and screenwriter
 Rex Haughton Hudson - former major league baseball pitcher

References

External links
Nathan Hale High School

Public high schools in Oklahoma
Educational institutions established in 1959
Magnet schools in Oklahoma
1959 establishments in Oklahoma
Tulsa Public Schools schools